The St. Mary's Syro-Malabar Cathedral Basilica is a cathedral in Ernakulam, Kerala, India. It was founded in 1112, and is also known by the names Nasrani Palli, Anchikaimal Palli or Thekke Palli. The church is the headquarters of the Major Archeparchy of Ernakulam-Angamaly, which is the Primatal See of the Syro-Malabar Church.

History
The present church building was constructed in the early twentieth century under the direction of Mar Aloysius Pazheparambil and was elevated to the status of a Basilica by Pope Paul VI on 20 March 1974.

The large, tall and spacious cathedral has an altar that was used by pope John Paul II, when he visited India during 7 February 1986. The altar depicts the birth, the crucifixion and the resurrection of Jesus Christ. The two 68-foot tall towers in the front have statues of St Peter and St Paul on top, and the bell tower (88 feet high) has St. Thomas statue on top. There is also a depiction of Jesus's apparition to St Thomas.

Gallery

See also
Kottakkavu Mar Thoma Syro-Malabar Pilgrim Church, North Paravur
Mar Hormiz Syro-Malabar Catholic Church, Angamaly
St. George Syro-Malabar Catholic Forane Church, Edappally
List of cathedrals in India

References

External links

 Profile

Archdiocese of Ernakulam-Angamaly
Tourist attractions in Kochi
Basilica churches in Kerala
Syro-Malabar Catholic cathedrals
1112 establishments in Asia
Religious organizations established in the 1110s
12th-century churches in India
St. Mary's Syro-Malabar Catholic Cathedral Basilica, Ernakulam
12th-century establishments in India
Church buildings with domes
Eastern Catholic churches in Kochi